Andreea Maria Iridon (born 23 November 1999 in Tilișca)  is a former Romanian artistic gymnast. She won a silver on balance beam and a bronze on uneven bars at the 2015 European Games. At the 2014 Junior European Championships Iridon won silvers on beam and floor, and a bronze with the team.

Personal life 
Iridon's family lives in Tilişca, but she trained in Deva, Romania. Iridon's favorite events are floor and beam, . Her goal in gymnastics was to go to the Olympics and win a gold medal on bars.

Junior career

2013 
Iridon's international debut was at a friendly meet with Germany and the United States. She placed third with the Romanian team and tenth in the all-around.

In July, Iridon competed at the 2013 European Youth Summer Olympic Festival with teammates Laura Jurca and Silvia Zarzu, and they won a bronze medal. Individually, she tied with Claire Martin of France for the bronze on beam. She finished fourth on floor, just 0.1 behind her teammate Silvia Zarzu. At the Japan Junior International, Iridon won a silver medal on bars behind Bailie Key.

At the Romanian National Championships she won a bronze in the all-around behind Larisa Iordache and Andreea Munteanu. She won a bronze on uneven bars, and she finished sixth on balance beam. At the Japan Junior International, Iridon won a silver medal on bars behind Bailie Key. In October, she competed at the Romanian Junior National Championships, she won gold on bars and beam but finished twentieth in the all-around.

2014 
Iridon competed at the City of Jesolo Trophy where she won a silver medal with the Romanian team by contributing on bars and beam. She won the bronze medal on beam with a 14.300. She competed in the France-Romania-Belgium Tri-Friendly meet where she won team and all-around gold.

In May, Irdion competed at the European Championships. She contributed scores on all events towards Romania's bronze medal finish. In the all-around final, she finished 6th with a total of 53.933. She won a silver medal in the balance beam final behind Angelina Melnikova with a score of 14.433. She tied for the silver medal in the floor final with British gymnast Amy Tinkler.

At the Romanian National Championships, Iridon won a bronze medal in the all-around behind Larisa Iordache and Ștefania Stănilă. She won a silver on the uneven bars behind Larisa Iordache, and she finished third on beam behind Andreea Munteanu and Larisa Iordache.

Senior career

2015 
Andreea competed at Trofeo Torino 4 Nazioni where she placed 3rd with the Romanian team after Russia and Italy. In June she was selected to compete at the 2015 European Games and helped Romanian team finish in 7th place. She placed 3rd on uneven bars with 12.800 after she fell and 2nd on balance beam with 14.000, behind Lieke Wevers. She also qualified in the all-around final, but was replaced by Laura Jurca.

2016 
Iridon's final competition was the Belgium Friendly where the Romanian team finished second to Belgium. Andreea Iridon announced her retirement following Romania's failure to qualify a full team to the 2016 Olympic Games.

Competitive History

References 

1999 births
Living people
Romanian female artistic gymnasts
Gymnasts at the 2015 European Games
European Games medalists in gymnastics
European Games bronze medalists for Romania
European Games silver medalists for Romania
People from Sibiu County
21st-century Romanian women